Hop Island is one of the largest of the Rauer Islands, lying  west-south-west of Filla Island. It was charted by Norwegian cartographers from aerial photos taken by the Lars Christensen Expedition (1936–37), who gave the name Hopoy. They charted the feature as being even larger, including a southern arm enclosing a cove. The feature was more accurately delineated by John H. Roscoe in 1952 from air photos taken by U.S. Navy Operation Highjump (1946–47). The name Hop Island has been retained for the largest segment of the feature as suggested by Roscoe.

Important Bird Area
A 532 ha site comprising the whole island has been designated an Important Bird Area (IBA) by BirdLife International because it supports about 51,000 breeding pairs of Adélie penguinss, estimated from 2011 satellite imagery, as well as a colony of south polar skuas.

See also 
 List of Antarctic and Subantarctic islands

References

External links

Important Bird Areas of Antarctica
Seabird colonies
Penguin colonies
Islands of Princess Elizabeth Land